T19 may refer to:

Rail and transit

Lines 
 T19 line, of the Stockholm Metro

Rolling stock 
 Electron T19, a Ukrainian trolley bus
 GER Class T19, a British steam locomotive

Stations 
 Hirabari Station, Nayoga, Aichi, Japan
 Minami-Gyōtoku Station, Ichikawa, Chiba, Japan
 Nakazakichō Station, Osaka, Japan
 Shin-Sapporo Station, Hokkaido, Japan
 Shido Station, Sanuki, Kagawa, Japan

Other uses 
 T-19, a Soviet tank 
 
 Junkers T 19, a German trainer aircraft
 T19 Howitzer Motor Carriage, an American self-propelled gun